Henry Abramson (born 1963) is the dean of the Lander College of Arts and Sciences in Flatbush, New York. Before that, he served as the Dean for Academic Affairs and Student Services at Touro College's Miami branch (Touro College South). He is notable for his teachings on Jewish history and Judaism as a religion.

Biography
Henry Abramson was born and raised in Iroquois Falls, Ontario. He received his doctorate in History from the University of Toronto in 1995, studying under Professor Paul Robert Magocsi, earning the first PhD in Ukrainian-Jewish history awarded since the establishment of the Chair of Ukrainian Studies there.  His research was also supervised by Professor Michael Marrus and Professor Zvi Gitelman.

Abramson was named to the Shevchenko Scientific Society in 1999.

He was Assistant and later Associate Professor of History/Jewish Studies at Florida Atlantic University from 1996-2006 and during that time held appointments at a number of institutions including Oxford University, Cornell University, Harvard University, and Hebrew University. While teaching at Hebrew University, he simultaneously attended the class taught by Rabbi Mendel Weinbach at Ohr Somayach, Jerusalem. His study partners there included Rabbi Natan Gamedze. As Associate Professor and University Library Scholar of Judaica, he worked with the large collection of Yiddish materials in the Wimberly Library, and in this capacity he founded the Kultur Festival of Yiddish Culture in Boca Raton.

In 2006, Abramson moved to his position at Touro College South. Since 2015 he serves as Dean of the Avenue J campus of Touro College in Brooklyn, New York. He has since founded the Flatbush Society of Fellows, an honours program for students at the Avenue J campus of Touro College.

Effective from September 2018, he was named Dean and Chief Academic Officer of Machon L’Parnasa Institute for Professional Studies at Touro College. The responsibilities of this position include working with the College architects and construction teams in the design and construction of a new campus, the overhaul of existing associate degree programs and the creation of vocation-oriented academic programming. Abramson also gives a class on the Mesillat Yesharim at the Young Israel of Lawrence Cedarhurst, and an online Jewish History course for Landers college for men as well as for Lander College of Arts & Sciences. The online Jewish History course gives an extensive amount of articles, videos, and material covering various topics throughout Jewish history. Including topics such as the Spanish Expulsion, the Haskalah, and the Holocaust, Abramson's online Jewish History course allows his students to gain deeper insight and greater understanding of their roots and their ancestors' history.

Scholarship
Henry Abramson is largely known for his scholarship in Ukrainian Jewish history and antisemitic iconography. Abramson also was curator for an exhibit on the history of antisemitic iconography in Florida entitled "The Art of Hatred".

Abramson has also been a popularizer of Jewish thought, publishing a primer of Talmud and other works on the Jewish intellectual tradition. He is also known for his work on Rabbi Kalonymus Kalmish Shapiro, a Hasidic Rabbi active in the Warsaw Ghetto during the Holocaust. In 2014, Abramson published "The Kabbalah of Forgiveness: The Thirteen Levels of Mercy", a translation of Tomer Devorah by Moses Cordovero ("Date Palm of Devorah").

Abramson is the author of the Jewish History in Daf Yomi podcast, a project of the Orthodox Union Daf Yomi Initiative. Since the Spring of 2019, he has been recording brief videos discussing historical aspects of the daily Talmud study program called Daf Yomi. The overall project will require over 2,700 videos over seven years of research.

References

External links
 Henry Abramson on YouTube
 Henry Abramson's Website

Touro College faculty
University of Toronto alumni
Florida Atlantic University faculty
Historians of the University of Oxford
Harvard University faculty
Cornell University faculty
Academic staff of the Hebrew University of Jerusalem
Jewish American historians
American male non-fiction writers
People from Iroquois Falls, Ontario
Living people
Historians of Jews and Judaism
1963 births
Canadian emigrants to the United States
21st-century American historians
21st-century American male writers
21st-century American Jews